Tiwari is a surname of the Hindu Brahmin communities commonly found in India and Nepal. Alternative spellings include Tiwary and Tewari.

Notable people

Independence activists
Chandra Shekhar Azad (born Chandrashekhar Tiwari)
Adrian Cola Rienzi (born Krishna Deonarine Tiwari), Indian freedom fighter in Trinidad and Tobago

Spiritual leaders 
 Dayananda Saraswati (born Mool Shankar Tiwari), founder of the Arya Samaj
 Maya Tiwari, Indo-Guyanese spiritual leader, international speaker and author
 Sahadeo Tiwari, religious scholar

Information technology and business

Academics
Arun Tiwari, missile scientist, author and professor
S Prakash Tiwari, biotechnologist, geneticist, agriculturalist
Siddhartha Paul Tiwari, UNESCO Chair on technology and sustainability
 Deepak Tiwari, Hindi editor of Global Investigative Journalism Network and former Vice Chancellor of Makhanalal Chaturvedi National University of Journalism, Bhopal

Civil service 
Sivakant Tiwari, former legal head officer of the Singapore Legal Service
 A. N. Tiwari, former Chief Information Commissioner of India

Politicians 
Captain B P Tiwari, Indian politician and former army officer
Brij Bhushan Tiwari, Indian politician from the Samajwadi Party
Ghanshyam Tiwari, Indian politician, education minister in the Government of Rajasthan
Ghanshyam Tiwari (Indian politician) from the Samajwadi party, Bihar
Hari Shankar Tiwari, politician
Kamlesh Tiwari, politician
Kapil Narayan Tiwari, politician
Kaushal Tiwari, Indian politician
Manish Tewari, politician, former Minister of State in UPA Government
Manoj Tiwari, Indian politician, MP from Delhi, BJP State President.
Narayan Datt Tiwari, Indian politician, former chief minister of Uttar Pradesh and Uttarakhand
Ram Chandra Tiwari, Nepalese politician
Ravindranath Tewari, Indian politician, former cabinet minister of Uttar Pradesh
Sita Tiwaree, Thai politician
Shivanand Tiwari, Janata Dal (United) politician
Sriniwas Tiwari, Indian politician, former Madhya Pradesh speaker and minister
Sushil Kumar 'Indu' Tiwari, MLA from Madhya Pradesh
Suresh Tiwari, MLA from Uttar Pradesh, Bharatiya Janata Party
Rajani Tiwari, Politician from Uttar Pradesh
Upendra Tiwari, Indian politician, minister in Uttar Pradesh government

Military Officers 
Amit Tiwari (air marshal), Indian Air Force, former Air Officer Commanding-in-Chief, Central Air Command.

Entertainment 
Ankit Tiwari, playback singer and music director
Anuj Tiwari, Indian novelist
Nitesh Tiwari, director, script writer, lyricist
Bhushan Tiwari, Hindi actor
Dharmesh Tiwari, Indian film director
Girish Tiwari, scriptwriter, director, lyricist, singer, poet, organic culturist, writer, and social activist in Uttarakhand, India
Kartik Tiwari, actor
Lalit Mohan Tiwari, Indian film and television actor
Laxmi Ganesh Tewari, Indian vocalist
Manish Tiwary, Indian film-maker
Gaurav Tiwari, Transgender Bollywood Civil Rights Icon
Manoj Tiwari, Bhojpuri actor, singer and director
Mukesh Tiwari, actor in Hindi, Tamil and Telugu films
Shweta Tiwari, Indian film and television actress and producer
Anand Tiwari, actor and director in Hindi films
Ridhima Tiwari, television actress
Vindhya Tiwari, Indian show and film actress
 Indira Tiwari, Indian actress
 Surbhi Tiwari, Indian television actress

Literature 
Bhim Nidhi Tiwari, Nepalese Bahun poet
Kapil Muni Tiwary, linguist and scholar
Nilkanth Tiwari, Indian poet
Siyaram Tiwari, writer and scholar
Anuj Tiwari, Indian novelist
Ankit Tiwari, research scholar

Sports 
Manoj Tiwary, Indian cricketer
Saurabh Tiwary, Indian cricketer

Other
Dudhnath Tiwari, Indian sepoy who lived with the Andamanese tribes.
 Ram Puneet Tiwary, Singaporean Indian and acquitted suspect of the Sydney double murders.

References

Indian surnames